foobar2000 (often abbreviated as fb2k or f2k) is a freeware audio player for Microsoft Windows, iOS and Android developed by Peter Pawłowski. It has a modular design, which provides user flexibility in configuration and customization. Standard "skin" elements can be individually augmented or replaced with different dials and buttons, as well as visualizers such as waveform, oscilloscope, spectrum, spectrogram (waterfall), peak and smoothed VU meters. foobar2000 offers third-party user interface modifications through a software development kit (SDK).

foobar2000 supports many audio file formats, has many features for organizing metadata, files, and folders, and has a converter interface for use with command line encoders. To maximize audio fidelity in cases where resampling or downscaling in bit depth is required, it provides noise shaping and dithering. There are a number of official and third-party components which add many additional features. The core is closed source, whereas the SDK is licensed under the Three-Clause BSD license.

History and development
foobar2000 was first released in 2002 and developed by Peter Pawłowski, who had previously worked at Nullsoft and developed plugins for Winamp. He created foobar2000 with the audiophile community in mind. The software's mascot and logo icon consists of a white "alien cat".

foobar2000 supports Windows, though the support of older versions for Windows XP and Vista has been dropped as of version 1.6 (released 2020). Windows 2000 support was dropped as of version 0.9.5 (released 2008) and Windows 95/98/ME/NT4 support was dropped as of version 0.9 (released 2006).

foobar2000 versions since 0.9.5 feature a revamped default interface, with embedded support for album list, album art, spectrum visualization, and some other features and improvements. 

In May 2016, versions for mobile devices were released, and in January 2018, an early beta version for macOS was released.

In August 2022, a beta version of foobar2000 v2.0 was released with 64-bit support, Dark mode, and hardware-accelerated visualizations.

Features

Core 
At its core, foobar2000 natively supports a range of audio formats, including MP1, MP2, MP3, MPC, AAC, WMA, Ogg Vorbis, FLAC / Ogg FLAC, ALAC, WavPack, WAV, AIFF, AU, SND, CD, Speex, and Opus.

foobar2000 also has a highly customizable user interface, advanced tagging capabilities and support for ripping Audio CDs, as well as transcoding of all supported audio formats using the Converter component. The player can read inside ZIP, GZIP, and RAR archives. Core functionality has also been tested to work under Wine on Linux, although the program's crash reporter will detect Wine and direct the user to the Wine Bugzilla.

Additional features include ReplayGain support (for both playback and calculation), gapless playback, keyboard shortcuts and support for DSP effects such as equalization and crossfade.

Users can configure the foobar2000 Media Library with automated folder watching and Windows Media streaming. The client is built with an open component architecture, allowing third-party developers to extend functionality of the player.

Optional 
With addons or plugins, foobar2000 can read the APE, HDCD, AC3, DTS, SACD and DVD-Audio formats.

Other optional features include playback statistics, CD burning, kernel streaming, ASIO support and WASAPI output compatibility. Third-party support is also present in the audio client. For instance, foobar2000 supports Last.fm scrobbling and integration with Apple iPod, including album art support and automatic transcoding of audio formats not supported by iPod itself.

Derivative works
foobar2000 developer Peter Pawłowski has also made other audio software, including Boom, which his web site describes as an "easy to use audio player intended for casual computer users".  It runs on Windows.

See also 
 Comparison of audio player software

Notes

References

External links 

 
Hydrogenaudio Knowledgebase (HAK) – official knowledge-base for foobar2000.

2002 software
Windows media players
Tag editors
Windows CD ripping software